Antal Günther (23 September 1847 – 23 February 1920) was a Hungarian politician and journalist, who served as Minister of Justice between 1907 and 1909. He was the President of the Curia Regia from 1909 to 1920. He also served as a Deputy Speaker of the House of Magnates between 1917 and 1918.

References
 Magyar Életrajzi Lexikon

1847 births
1920 deaths
Justice ministers of Hungary
Hungarian people of German descent